Attilio (Italian pronunciation: [atˈtiːljo]) is an Italian masculine name. Notable people with that name include:

Attilio Bertolucci (1911–2000), Italian poet and writer
Attilio Biseo (1901–1966), Italian aviator
Attilio Deffenu (1890–1918), Italian journalist
Attilio Demaría (1909–1990), Italian Argentine footballer
Attilio Fontana (born 1952), Italian politician
Attilio Fresia (1891–1923), Italian footballer
Attilio Galassini (1933–2002), Italian footballer 
Attilio Giovannini (1924–2005), Italian footballer
Attilio Lombardo (born 1966), Italian retired footballer and football manager
Attilio Marcora (1899–1979), Italian footballer
Attilio Micheluzzi (1930–1990), Italian comics artist
Attilio Nicodemo (born 1974), Italian footballer
Attilio Nicora (1937–2017), Italian Catholic cardinal
Attilio Piccirilli (1866–1945), American sculptor
Attilio Pratella (1856–1949), Italian painter
Attilio Ruffini (1924–2011), Italian politician
Attilio Sorbi (born 1959), Italian retired footballer and football manager 
Attilio Tesser (born 1958), Italian retired footballer and football manager
Attilio Trerè (1887–1943), Italian footballer
Attilio Valobra (1892–1956), Italian footballer
Attilio Viviani (born 1996), Italian cyclist

Italian masculine given names